Elliot Cadeau (born September 4, 2004) is a basketball player who attends Link Academy in Branson, Missouri. He is a consensus five-star recruit and one of the top players in the 2024 recruiting class. He has committed to the North Carolina Tar Heels.

Born in the United States, he represents Sweden internationally.

Early life
Cadeau was born in Brooklyn, New York, but was raised in West Orange, New Jersey from the age of three months. His father, James, is Haitian while his mother, Michelle, is Swedish, hailing from Skåne. As a young child he loved American football and was a fan of the New York Jets, but he was discouraged from playing the sport because his mother thought it was too dangerous, suggesting he try out for a basketball team instead. He also played baseball, soccer and tennis, but decided to focus on basketball in fifth grade.

Cadeau attended The Patrick School in Hillside, New Jersey, for seventh and eighth grade. During this time he helped his club team, Sports U/Team IZOD, win the 2019 Under Armour Nationals.

High school career
Cadeau began his high school career at Bergen Catholic High School in Oradell, New Jersey. He served as the Crusaders' starting point guard during his freshman season, which was shortened due to the COVID-19 pandemic. Cadeau averaged 11.3 points, 4.6 rebounds and 4.2 assists per game, leading his team to a 7–2 record. He was named to the MaxPreps Freshman All-American First Team. Cadeau missed his entire sophomore season due to a high ankle sprain he suffered during a scrimmage against Gill St. Bernard's School in December 2021. He transferred to Link Academy in Branson, Missouri, ahead of his junior year.

Cadeau plays for New Heights Lightning on the Nike Elite Youth Basketball League (EYBL) circuit. He was named to the EYBL All-Underclassman team in 2021, and earned All-EYBL Third Team honors in 2022.

Recruiting
Cadeau is widely regarded as the top point guard in the class of 2024.

In September 2022, Cadeau took his first official visit to Texas Tech, which he described as his dream school growing up. This was followed by a visit to North Carolina the following month. On December 28, 2022, Cadeau committed to coach Hubert Davis of North Carolina.

National team career

Junior teams
Cadeau played a tournament in Sweden with his middle school team and caught the attention of the country's national team coaches when they discovered he had Swedish heritage. He was invited to the national under-15 team training camp and helped the team take first place at the 2019 North Sea Development Basketball Cup held in Denmark, averaging 9.3 points, 2.7 rebounds and 1.7 assists per game. Cadeau was subsequently called up to the national under-16 team ahead of the 2020 Baltic Sea Basketball Cup held in Estonia, where he helped Sweden win the gold medal.

Cadeau led the national under-18 team to a gold medal at the 2021 Under-18 Nordic Championships. He was unable to repeat this feat at the following year's edition, where Sweden finished fourth. In the opening game against Estonia, Cadeau recorded 40 points, seven rebounds and five steals. He was named the MVP of the tournament.

Cadeau helped Sweden win a gold medal at the 2022 FIBA U18 European Championship Division B in Romania, averaging 21.3 points, 4.3 rebounds, and 4.0 assists per game. He recorded 36 points, five rebounds, four assists, and four steals in the championship game victory against Denmark, earning tournament MVP honors.

Senior team
Cadeau received his first call-up to the senior national team in November 2021 ahead of a pair of FIFA World Cup qualifiers against Finland and Slovenia. Being that he was only 17 years old, he called the decision completely unexpected.

Cadeau made his senior debut on 24 February 2023 against Germany in a 2023 World Cup qualifying game in Frankfurt, and he recorded four points and one steal in seven minutes of play.

Personal life
Cadeau comes from an athletic family. His father was an avid tennis player while his older brother, Justin, plays college tennis at Howard.

Cadeau also has congenital hearing loss and is deaf in his right ear.

Social media and endorsements
On January 1, 2022, Cadeau became the first high school basketball player to sign with Roc Nation Sports for Name, Image and Likeness (NIL) representation.

In April 2022, he signed an endorsement deal with Swedish vitamin drink Vitamin Well, becoming the first American high school athlete to sign an international NIL deal. He also has deals with Leaf Trading Cards, Wilson Sporting Goods and Swedish company Flowlife. In addition, he has his own clothing line called Elliot Cadeau Wear.

References

External links
 
 Swedish Basketball Federation profile 
 Elliot Cadeau at RealGM

2004 births
Living people
American men's basketball players
American people of Swedish descent
American sportspeople of Haitian descent
Basketball players from New Jersey
Basketball players from New York City
Bergen Catholic High School alumni
People from West Orange, New Jersey
Point guards
Sportspeople from Brooklyn
Sportspeople from Essex County, New Jersey
Swedish men's basketball players